The Supreme Court of the Northern Territory is the superior court for the Australian Territory of the Northern Territory. It has unlimited jurisdiction within the territory in civil matters, and hears the most serious criminal matters. It is around the middle of the Australian court hierarchy.

Early history
Shortly after the first settlement at Palmerston, Port Darwin in 1869–70, pressure was placed upon the South Australian government to establish a superior court in the then Northern Territory of South Australia. Although such a court was mooted, it was decided to send judges to Palmerston on circuit. The first circuit court was held in February 1875.

Thereafter, from 1875 to 1884, the government appointed persons as commissioners (usually the Government Resident) to exercise the power of a judge of the Supreme Court of South Australia in all but trials of capital offences.

From 1884 to 1911, a resident judge, with the title "Judge of the Northern Territory" exercised the full powers of the Supreme Court of South Australia under the Northern Territory Justice Act.

History
The court was established on 30 May 1911, shortly after South Australia surrendered the territory to the Commonwealth. The first judge of the court was Samuel James Mitchell. The only person to hold the office of Chief Judge, which was created in 1975, was Sir William Forster who held the position from 1977-1979. The position title was changed to Chief Justice in 1979, and Forster was the first Chief Justice from 1979-1985. There have been 6 Chief Justices since 1979 . There are currently six resident judges (including the Chief Justice) and two additional judges and two acting judges, making a total of ten Supreme Court justices. 

In 1927, when the Northern Australia 1926 Act (Cth) came into force, the Northern Territory was divided into two territories; North Australia and Central Australia. The Supreme Court was not abolished, but continued to exist as the Supreme Court of North Australia and the Supreme Court of Central Australia. After the Northern Territory Act was repealed in 1931, the Northern Territory was reconstituted as a single Territory of the Commonwealth. The Supreme Court of Central Australia was abolished and the Supreme Court of North Australia  continued as the Supreme Court of the Northern Territory.

In 1935 the Court began its first sittings on circuit in Alice Springs , a practice which still continues today. Circuit sittings in Katherine were also introduced in 1996.

When a new Supreme Court complex was built, Indigenous artist Norah Nelson Napaljarri was chosen to design a mosaic for its forecourt.
The design concept of the Supreme Court, as requested by the client the Northern Territory Government, was to reflect the elements of the "Greek Revival" Hong Kong Shanghai Bank constructed in Hong Kong in the 1800s viz: the colonnade around the building, the mansard roof and the portico entrance as well as giving reference to its tropical location and its colonial past.
The collaborating architects were Peter Doig, Ron Findlay and Roger Linklater: the interior was designed by Susie Cole.
The architectural style is best described as Neo-colonial.

Other
The Supreme Court occasionally sits in other locations in the Northern Territory, including Katherine, Tennant Creek and Nhulunbuy. The Supreme Court has also on occasion sat at remote aboriginal communities.

The Supreme Court includes the Court of Appeal, Court of Criminal Appeal, Civil and Criminal Trials and Appeals from the Northern Territory Magistrates Court. 

Judgments from Supreme Court trials are available to the public , as are the sentencing remarks , unless a suppression order has been taken preventing these being released (for example, involving juveniles, public figures or in some controversial matters).

Judges of the Supreme Court of the Northern Territory
As at November 2019 (appointment date in brackets):

Chief Justice

Judges

Additional Judges

Acting Judges

Master

See also
 Family Court of Australia
 Federal Court of Australia
 Judiciary of Australia
 List of Judges of the Supreme Court of the Northern Territory

References

External links
 The Northern Territory Supreme Court Website
 Sentencing Principles

 
Buildings and structures in Darwin, Northern Territory
1911 establishments in Australia
Courts and tribunals established in 1911